Raymond or Ray Parker may refer to:

Raymond Parker (politician) (born 1937), American politician
Raymond Parker (canoeist) (1919–2009), British sprint canoer
Ray Parker Jr. (born 1954), American guitarist, songwriter, producer and recording artist
Ray Parker (painter) (1922–1990), American painter
Ray Parker (footballer) (1925–2006), English footballer